Yu Shasha (born on 30 May 1985 in Yantai, Shandong, China), is a Chinese actress and host. She had graduation of higher vocational performance at Beijing Film Academy in the year 2003, after debutante on her career.

Career and achievements 
Yu have certain plenty experience in acting and some experience in hosting television shows. She and Shen Ling was jointly hosted at the second season of A Bright World (世界青年说) which the Chinese talk show based on popular South Korean talk show Non-Summit in year 2016 that invites those foreigners are living and studying in China as holding discussions in Standard Chinese on various topics and issues, talk show in Informal Talks (非正式会谈) as secretary general at second season in certain episodes and Nic Li jointly hosted in Lip Sync Battle (对口型大作战). She also invited to be guest at members of the judge group on variety music show Come Sing with Me in 2016 - 2017, Yu had won the most inspirational artist of BQ celebrity score awards in 2013 and nominee the best actress at web series of golden guduo media awards in 2016.

Filmography

TV Series

Movies

TV Shows

References

External links 
 

1985 births
Living people
Actresses from Shandong
Chinese television actresses
Chinese television presenters
Chinese film actresses
Beijing Film Academy alumni
Chinese women television presenters